The Tokyo Music Festival was an international music contest that ran from 1972 to 1992. It was organized by the Tokyo Music Festival Association.  The first edition of the Tokyo Music Festival took place on 13 May 1972 with 12 participating countries.

Grand Prix Winners 
1972: Izumi Yukimura, with "Watashi wa Nakanai"
1973: Mickey Newbury, with "Heaven Help the Child"
1974: René Simard, with "Midori-iro no Yane"
1975: Maureen McGovern, with "Even Better Than I Know Myself"
1976: Natalie Cole, with "I'm Glad There Is You"
1977: Marilyn McCoo & Billy Davis Jr., with "The Two of Us"
1978: Al Green, with "Belle"
1979: Rita Coolidge, with "Don't Cry Out Loud"
1980: Dionne Warwick, with "Feeling Old Feelings"
1981: The Nolans, with "Sexy Music"
1982: John O'Banion, with "I Don't Wanna Lose Your Love"
1983: Lionel Richie, with "You Are"; Joe Cocker and Jennifer Warnes, with "Up Where We Belong"
1984: Laura Branigan, with "The Lucky One"
1985: Kool & the Gang, with "Cherish"
1986: Miami Sound Machine, with "Conga"
1987: No Grand Prix awarded
1988: No Grand Prix awarded
1989: Ofra Haza, with "Im Nin'alu"
1990: Wilson Phillips, with "Hold On"
1991: Cancelled
1992: Smokey Mountain, with "Paraiso"

See also
List of historic rock festivals

Music festivals in Japan
Recurring events disestablished in 1991
Festivals in Tokyo
1972 establishments in Japan
Pop music festivals
Music festivals established in 1972
Rock festivals in Japan